Tondema is a Central African basketball club based in Bangui. Founded in 1976, the team plays in the Bangui Basketball League and won the championship in 2003, 2013, and 2021.

In October 2021, Tondema played in the qualifying tournament of the Basketball Africa League (BAL) for the first time.

Honours
Bangui Basketball League
Champions: 2003, 2013, 2021

Players

Current roster 
The following is the Tondema roster for the 2022 BAL Qualifying Tournaments.

References

Basketball teams in the Central African Republic
Bangui
Basketball teams established in 1976
1976 establishments in Africa
Road to BAL teams